Jacques Couderc de Fonlongue (2 September 1891 – 28 December 1986) was a French equestrian. He competed in two events at the 1928 Summer Olympics.

References

1891 births
1986 deaths
French male equestrians
Olympic equestrians of France
Equestrians at the 1928 Summer Olympics
Place of birth missing